Roger Ulick Branch Westman (16 September 1939 - 29 April 2020) was a British architect.

Early life and education 
Westman was born at Jarrow, County Durham in 1939. He attended Latymer Upper School in Hammersmith and the Architectural Association School of Architecture. At the AA, he received the RIBA Howard Colls Travelling Studentship Award in 1959, allowing him to study for a short time at the Polytechnic University of Milan.

Architecture and design 
Westman began his career at Lambeth council's architecture planning department. He worked with Edward Hollamby and Rosemary Stjernstedt on Central Hill Estate, a social housing estate completed in 1974. He designed a large number of homes in Hampstead, Hampstead Garden Suburb, and Highgate. Westman was an early proponent of sustainable architecture, particularly in large-scale building projects. He wrote an article on sustainable architecture in 1982 for the Architects' Journal, after which sustainable architecture became an important part of late-twentieth and twenty-first century architecture. During his career, he won several prizes from the Royal Institute of British Architects. Westman gave guest lectures on architectural history at the AA, Cambridge, Oxford Brookes, and Bath, until 1999.

Exhibitions 
Between June and July 1981, Westman exhibited his scheme 'Walls: A Framework for Communal Anarchy' at the Institute of Contemporary Arts. Westman's exhibition received good reviews in The Times and the London Evening Standard.

Selected projects 

 Pepys Estate (1966)
 Cheviot Gardens (1968)
 Lillington Gardens (1971)
 Tara Hotel, Kensington (1973)
 Central Hill Estate (1974)
 Cressingham Gardens (1978)
 Alexandra Theatre, Bognor Regis (1980)
 South Lambeth Estate (1982)
 Jerma Palace Hotel, Malta (1982)
 Myatt’s Fields South Estate (1984)

Personal life 
He lived in Hampstead Garden Suburb with his wife, Jula. Together, they had two children. He was a member of the Twentieth Century Society, and was instrumental in the preservation of several 20th-century buildings. He was a friend of John Summerson until Summerson's death in 1992.

Westman died on 29 April 2020 at Hampstead Garden Suburb.

References

External links 
 Roger Westman on Architectuul
Roger Westman on International Architecture Database [or ArchINFORM]
Roger Westman on German National Library

1939 births
2020 deaths
People from Jarrow
British architects
British designers
People educated at Latymer Upper School
Alumni of the Architectural Association School of Architecture
20th-century English architects
English urban planners
Architecture critics